Walter Gates (1 June 1871 – 12 July 1939) was a South African épée, foil and sabre fencer. He competed at the 1908 and 1912 Summer Olympics.

References

External links
 

1871 births
1939 deaths
South African male épée fencers
Olympic fencers of South Africa
Fencers at the 1908 Summer Olympics
Fencers at the 1912 Summer Olympics
People from Camberwell
Sportspeople from London
English emigrants to South Africa
South African male foil fencers
South African male sabre fencers